There have been two baronetcies created for persons with the surname Rankin, both in the Baronetage of the United Kingdom. One creation is extant as of 2007.

The Rankin Baronetcy, of Bryngwyn in Much Dewchurch in the County of Hereford, was created in the Baronetage of the United Kingdom on 20 June 1898 for the Conservative politician James Rankin. The second Baronet was a soldier, war correspondent and writer on history and travels. The third Baronet was a noted eccentric. He assumed by deed poll the additional surname of Stewart in 1932 but discontinued it by deed poll in 1946. He also assumed the forename of Hugh in lieu of Herbert, but later changed it to Sammy Parks. The fourth baronet was the nephew of the third baronet: his eldest son became the fifth baronet on his death in 2020.

The Rankin Baronetcy, of Broughton Tower in the County of Lancaster, was created in the Baronetage of the United Kingdom on 5 March 1937 for Robert Rankin, Conservative Member of Parliament for Liverpool Kirkdale from 1931 to 1945. The title became extinct on his death in 1960.

Rankin baronets, of Bryngwyn (1898)
Sir James Rankin, 1st Baronet (1842–1915)
Sir (James) Reginald Lea Rankin, 2nd Baronet (1871–1931)
Sir Hugh Charles Rhys Rankin, 3rd Baronet (1899–1988)
Sir Ian Niall Rankin, 4th Baronet (1932–2020)
Sir Gavin Niall Rankin (born 1962)

The heir apparent to the baronetcy is the current holder's elder son, Tassilo Laurence Rankin (born 1998).

Rankin baronets, of Broughton Tower (1937)
Sir Robert Rankin, 1st Baronet (1877–1960)

Notes

References
Kidd, Charles, Williamson, David (editors). Debrett's Peerage and Baronetage (1990 edition). New York: St Martin's Press, 1990,

External links
Obituary of Sir Hugh Rankin, 3rd Baronet

Baronetcies in the Baronetage of the United Kingdom
Extinct baronetcies in the Baronetage of the United Kingdom